The Fall of the House of Usher (1928) is a short silent horror film adaptation of the 1839 short story "The Fall of the House of Usher" by Edgar Allan Poe. The movie was co-directed by James Sibley Watson and Melville Webber, and starred Herbert Stern, Hildegarde Watson, and Melville Webber (who also wrote the screenplay). It tells the story of a brother and sister who live under a family curse.  An avant-garde experimental film running only 13 minutes, the visual element predominates, including shots through prisms to create optical distortion. There is no dialogue in the film, though one sequence features letters written in the air moving across the screen.

A music score was written in 1959 for the film by the directors' friend, composer Alec Wilder. His 1959 score was his second attempt (after the score for winds, brass and percussion which he did for them originally in 1929), and he composed it for a recording of the New York Woodwind Quintet and a percussionist, conducted by Leon Barzin. The film and the 1959 score were later synched together by James Sibley Watson, and this was the version that was placed in the National Film Registry in 2000. Various new scores have been composed to accompany the film, including one by New Wave musician Tom Verlaine and guitarist Jimmy Rip, and another by American composer Jean Hasse's version (2010) for the UK ensemble Counterpoise (violin, trumpet, saxophone, piano), this version available to view on YouTube.

Plot
A traveller arrives at the desolate Usher mansion to find that the sibling inhabitants, Roderick and Madeline Usher, are living under a mysterious family curse: Roderick's senses have become painfully acute, while Madeline continues to get weaker with time. When Madeline apparently dies, Roderick has her buried in the family vault, not realizing she is merely in a catatonic state. Madeline awakens in her tomb, and realizing she has been buried alive, descends into madness as she escapes her coffin and seeks revenge.

Cast
 Herbert Stern as Roderick Usher
 Hildegarde Watson as Madeline Usher
 Melville Webber
 Friedrich Haak
 Dorothea House

Criticism
Film historian Troy Howarth comments: "The use of superimpositions, canted angles and tracking shots combine to create a sense of delirium....(the film) jettisons any pretense of plot and character and focuses instead on the presentation of Expressionistic visual effects. The actors have little opportunity to make much of an impression, and ultimately the film is a minor footnote in the canon of Edgar Allan Poe."

Influence
In 2000, the United States Library of Congress deemed the film "culturally, historically, or aesthetically significant film" and selected it for preservation in the National Film Registry.

See also
Treasures from American Film Archives
The Fall of the House of Usher (1928 French film)

References

External links
The Fall of the House of Usher essay by Scott Simmon at National Film Registry 
The Fall of the House of Usher essay by Daniel Eagan in America's Film Legacy: The Authoritative Guide to the Landmark Movies in the National Film Registry, A&C Black, 2010 , pp. 156–58 

 
 
Scrapbook of correspondence and clippings related to the films of Dr. James Sibley Watson, Jr. on New York Heritage

1928 films
1928 horror films
American black-and-white films
American silent short films
United States National Film Registry films
Films based on The Fall of the House of Usher
Films directed by James Sibley Watson
Articles containing video clips
American horror short films
Silent horror films
1920s American films